The Burry Port television relay station was originally built in Spring 1983 as a relay for UHF analogue colour television. It consists of a 17 m self-supporting lattice mast standing on a hillside which is itself about 90 m above sea level. Currently, the transmitters cater for most of the digital terrestrial TV subscribers in the low-lying coastal town of Burry Port. The transmission station is owned and operated by Arqiva.

Burry Port transmitter re-radiates the signal received off-air from Kilvey Hill about 20 km to the east. When it came, the digital switchover process for Burry Port duplicated the timing at the parent station, with the first stage taking place on Wednesday 12 August 2009 and the second stage was completed on Wednesday 9 September 2009, with the Kilvey Hill transmitter-group becoming the first in Wales to complete digital switchover. After the switchover process, analogue channels had ceased broadcasting permanently and the Freeview digital TV services were radiated at an ERP of 2 W each.

Channels listed by frequency

Analogue television

3 June 1983 - 12 August 2009
Burry Port (being in Wales) transmitted the S4C variant of the UK's Channel 4.

Analogue and digital television

12 August 2009 - 9 September 2009
The UK's digital switchover commenced at Kilvey Hill (and therefore at Burry Port and all its other relays) on 12 August 2009. Analogue BBC Two Wales on channel 64 was first to close, and ITV1 Wales was moved from channel 61 to channel 64 for its last month of service. Channel 61 was replaced by the new digital BBC A mux which started up in 64-QAM and at full power (i.e. 2 W).

Digital television

9 September 2009 - present
The remaining analogue TV services were closed down and the digital multiplexes took over the original analogue channels.

13 March 2013
OFCOM have announced that channel 61 is also to be cleared so as to make space for future 4G mobile phone services. Burry Port's "BBC A" multiplex will therefore be moved from channel 61 to channel 49.

References

External links
The Transmission Gallery: Burry Port

Transmitter sites in Wales
Wenvoe UHF 625-line Transmitter Group